Michael Offer is an Australian film and television director.

His television credits range from directing episodes of television series in his home country, Australia, to other regions such as the United Kingdom and the United States. Those credits include G.P., Water Rats, Sir Arthur Conan Doyle's The Lost World, The Bill, Holby City, Casualty, Homeland, The State Within the 2008 miniseries The Passion, Moses Jones, Persons Unknown, Terriers, The Chicago Code, Arrow, Last Resort, Hightown, Helstrom, The Cleaning Lady and Alert: Missing Persons Unit.

Offer is a graduate of Australian Film Television and Radio School.

References

External links

Australian expatriates in the United Kingdom
Australian expatriates in the United States
Australian film directors
Australian television directors
Living people
Place of birth missing (living people)
Year of birth missing (living people)